Gerson ben Solomon Catalan, also known as Gerson ben Solomon of Arles, was a French author who lived at Arles, France in the middle of the thirteenth century. He died, possibly at Perpignan, toward the end of the thirteenth century. According to Abraham Zacuto and others, he was the father of Levi ben Gerson (Gersonides).

Catalan compiled, about 1280, an encyclopedia entitled Sha'ar ha-Shamayim (Door of Heaven), which contains many quotations and even whole treatises from previous translations of works written in Arabic. Following Shem-Tov ibn Falaquera, he divided his work into three parts, dealing respectively with: (1) physics, including natural phenomena, metals, plants, animals, man, and a chapter on dreams; (2) astronomy, taken chiefly from Al-Fargani and the Almagest; and (3) theology or metaphysics, which part, as Catalan expressly says, contains nothing new, but is a copy of Maimonides' Book of the Soul. The Greek authors cited are Alexander of Aphrodisias, Aristotle, Empedocles, Galen, Hippocrates, Homer, Plato, Ptolemy, Pythagoras, Themistius, and Theophrastus; the Arabic: Ali ibn Abbas al-Magusi, Ali ibn Ridwan, Averroes, Avicenna, Costa ibn Lucca, Al-Farabi, Al-Fergani, Hunayn ibn Ishaq, Isaac Israeli, Ibn Tufail, and Ibn Zuhr. The work was published in Venice in 1547 and Rödelheim in 1801.

Bibliography
Steinschneider, Moritz, Catalogus Librorum Hebræorum in Bibliotheca Bodleiana, col. 1014
—, Hebräische Übersetzungen, pp. 9 et seq.
Gross, Henri, in Monatsschrift, xxx 20 et seq.
—, Gallia Judaica. Paris: Libraire Léopold Cerf, 1897
Senior Sachs, Kerem Chemed, viii 153 et seq.
Rossi, Giovanni Bernardo de and Hamberger, C.H., Historisches Wörterbuch der Jüdischen Schriftsteller, p. 69
Revue des Études Juives, v. 278, xvi, 186

A number of citations are to be found in David Kaufmann, Die Sinne. (See index.)

 

13th-century French writers
13th-century French Jews
French encyclopedists
French male writers
Medieval Jewish philosophers
Medieval Jewish writers
Provençal Jews
Year of death unknown
Year of birth unknown